Parmanand Jha (born 1946) is a Nepali politician who served as the first vice president of Nepal from 23 July 2008 to 31 October 2015. Previously he served as a Supreme Court judge. 

He was born and brought up in Darbhanga district in the Indian state of Bihar with his maternal uncle's home to a Nepali parents - according to Hindu traditions. His father's belongs to historical Mithila region of Nepal, and so he is a descendant native citizen and federal subject of Nepal. Jha resigned as a judge in December 2007 after he was not proposed by the Judicial Council.. Later, Jha joined political life and became a member of the Madhesi Janadhikar Forum. On 19 July 2008, he was elected as Vice-President of Nepal by the Constituent Assembly.

He began his first term of office as Vice-President of Nepal on 23 July 2008 by taking the oath of office from President Ram Baran Yadav at the Sheetal Niwas Presidential Palace in Maithili (despite he intended to take oath in Hindi) in the presence of Prime Minister Girijaprasad Koirala and others.

Hindi oath controversy

Jha's legitimacy as Vice-President was challenged for taking the oath of office in Hindi by Nepalis. Jha's mother tongue is Maithili but he is also fluent in Hindi, Bengali, and English.

A written petition was filed by Advocate Balkrishna Neupane at the apex court claiming that the oath was unconstitutional as it was taken in a language not recognized by the interim constitution. After a year long court procedure, the Supreme Court on 24 July 2009 ordered Jha to retake the oath of office and secrecy for the second time "in accordance with the Constitution," ruling that taking oath in Hindi was not constitutional.

However, Jha objected to the Supreme Court verdict, accusing the court of being biased and of conflict of interests. He stated that he would decide whether or not to retake the oath after consulting political parties and the "people he represents," i.e., the Madhesias who principally speak Maithili and Bhojpuri. He demanded changes to the law to ensure that all languages (i.e., Hindi) "are given due respect."

The Supreme Court's deadline for retaking the oath expired on 30 August 2009. As Jha did not swear once again the oath of office, the office was considered to have become vacant from 31 August 2009. In order to maintain political and ethnic inclusiveness, the Nepalese government did not seek a new Vice-President but continued to work with Jha towards a compromise, seeking to re-instate him. Changes were made to the law to allow the oath of office to be taken in native ethnic languages, e.g., Jha's native Maithili, and on 7 February 2010, he accordingly took a fresh oath of office as Vice-President in the Maithili language.

References

External links
 
 

1946 births
Living people
Madhesi Jana Adhikar Forum, Nepal politicians
20th-century Nepalese judges
Vice presidents of Nepal
Madhesi people
Nepalese Hindus
People from Rajbiraj
21st-century Nepalese judges